The American Academy of Social Work and Social Welfare (abbreviated AASWSW) is an honor society of American scholars and practitioners in the field of social work and social welfare. The academy was established in 2009, and its office is located at the Washington University in St. Louis, though the organization itself is incorporated as a 501 (c)(3) nonprofit organization in Ohio. Its first major initiative is the Grand Challenges for Social Work Initiative, the purpose of which is, according to Barth et al. (2014), to "help transform social work science, education, and practice around visionary and achievable challenges."

Fellows 
Mimi Abramovitz, DSW (inducted in 2015)
Amy Ai, PhD (inducted in 2021)
David L. Albright, PhD, (inducted in 2021)
Catherine Cubbin, PhD, (inducted in 2021)
Renee Cunningham-Williams, PhD (inducted in 2021)
Elizabeth M.Z. Farmer (inducted in 2021)
Colleen Galambos, PhD (inducted in 2021)
James Jaccard, PhD (inducted in 2016)
Barbara L. Jones, PhD (inducted in 2021)
Charles E. Lewis, Jr., PhD (inducted in 2021)
Michael A. Lindsey, PhD, MSW, MPH (inducted in 2021)
Kurt Organista, PhD  (inducted in 2021)
Deborah K. Padgett, PhD (inducted in 2011)
Kristen Slack, PhD  (inducted in 2021)
Dexter Voisin, PhD  (inducted in 2021)
Michael G. Vaughn, PhD (inducted in 2016)
Jerome Wakefield, PhD (inducted in 2020)
Marilyn Flynn
Richard Barth
Michael A. Lindsey
David Albright

References

External links

Social work organizations in the United States
Organizations established in 2009
Honor societies